The Mamiku River is a river of Saint Lucia.

See also
List of rivers of Saint Lucia

References

Rivers of Saint Lucia